Supreme is a census-designated place (CDP) in Assumption Parish, Louisiana, United States. The population was 1,052 at the 2010 census.

Geography
Supreme is located at  (29.859875, -90.985197).

Demographics

As of the census of 2000, there were 1,119 people, 328 households, and 267 families residing in the CDP. The racial makeup of the CDP was 84.36% African American, 14.48% White, 0.63% from two or more races, 0.36% from other races, and 0.18% Native American. Latino of any race were 1.70% of the population.

There were 328 households, out of which 43.3% had children under the age of 18 living with them, 39.6% were married couples living together, 32.0% had a female householder with no husband present, and 18.3% were non-families. 14.3% of all households were made up of individuals, and 4.9% had someone living alone who was 65 years of age or older. The average household size was 3.41 and the average family size was 3.79.

In the CDP, the population was spread out, with 37.2% under the age of 18, 10.0% from 18 to 24, 26.9% from 25 to 44, 20.2% from 45 to 64, and 5.7% who were 65 years of age or older. The median age was 28 years. For every 100 females, there were 90.3 males. For every 100 females age 18 and over, there were 82.6 males.

The median income for a household in the CDP was $16,354, and the median income for a family was $17,396. Males had a median income of $34,688 versus $12,670 for females. The per capita income for the CDP was $10,912. About 51.6% of families and 52.0% of the population were below the poverty line, including 56.2% of those under age 18 and 26.7% of those age 65 or over.

References

Census-designated places in Louisiana
Census-designated places in Assumption Parish, Louisiana